The Ecuadorian ambassador in Santiago de Chile is the official representative of the Government in Quito to the government of Chile.

List of representatives

References 

 
Chile
Ecuador